FlyArystan, is a Kazakh low-cost airline, with its hub at Almaty. The carrier commenced operations on 29 March 2019, with its inaugural flight on 1 May 2019 between Almaty and Nur-Sultan.

, FlyArystan serves to 16 destinations including 1 international destination. On 13 December 2019, The airline launched its first international flight from Nur-Sultan to  Moscow Zhukovsky Airport using an Airbus A320-200 aircraft which was earlier used by Air Astana.

In March 2020, FlyArystan suspended all international and domestic flights due to the COVID-19 pandemic.

This is a list of destinations served by FlyArystan. The table below provides each country served along with the destinations the airline flies to, as well as the name of the airports served. Terminated destinations are also listed.

List

References

FlyArystan